Jeff Winther (born 30 March 1988) is a Danish professional golfer. He joined the European Tour in 2016 and won the 2021 Mallorca Golf Open.

Career
Winther turned professional in 2012 and won on his fifth appearance as a professional, playing in the 2012 Nordic Golf League. Two further victories the following year helped him finish third in the Order of Merit and earn promotion to the Challenge Tour.

On the 2015 Challenge Tour, Winther finished third at the D+D Real Slovakia Challenge, Aegean Airlines Challenge Tour and the NBO Golf Classic Grand Final, to end the season in 11th place on the Order of Merit, earning promotion to the European Tour.

On the 2016 European Tour, he finished runner-up at the Tshwane Open in South Africa to climb into the top 250 on the Official World Golf Ranking, but only kept his card through Qualifying School in 2016, 2017 and 2018.

In 2019, Winther finished fourth at the Mutuactivos Open de España and 91st in the 2019 Race to Dubai to keep his card. At the 2020 Commercial Bank Qatar Masters, he was clear at the top midway through the last round and was on track for his first European Tour victory, when he bogeyed the 12th, 16th and 17th holes to drop into a tie for third, one stroke shy of joining the playoff between Jorge Campillo and David Drysdale. He finished the season ranked 96th in the Race to Dubai.

In October 2021, Winther won his first European Tour event at the Mallorca Golf Open. He shot 62 twice on the way to a one-shot victory.

Professional wins (4)

European Tour wins (1)

Nordic Golf League wins (3)

See also
2015 Challenge Tour graduates
2016 European Tour Qualifying School graduates
2017 European Tour Qualifying School graduates
2018 European Tour Qualifying School graduates

References

External links

Danish male golfers
European Tour golfers
Sportspeople from the Capital Region of Denmark
People from Gladsaxe Municipality
1988 births
Living people